Horatio Nelson Powell (1806–1869) was an English jockey who won the 1841 Grand National on Charity.
Powell rode in 10 Grand Nationals between 1839 and 1849.He moved to Australia, where he was admitted as a solicitor by the Supreme Court of Victoria in July 1861.

Powell died on 29 November 1869 in Echuca, Victoria, in Australia, following a buggy accident.

References

1806 births
1869 deaths
English jockeys